Bronwyn Holloway-Smith is an artist and author from Wellington, New Zealand. She holds a PhD in Fine Arts from Massey University, and is Co-Director of Public Art Heritage Aotearoa New Zealand, a research initiative based at Massey University's Toi Rauwhārangi College of Creative Arts.

Early life and education
Holloway-Smith graduated from Massey University with a Bachelor of Fine Arts (First Class Honours) in 2006. She completed her PhD at Massey University College of Creative Arts in 2018.

Career

She describes herself as interested in "internet culture, 3-dimensional printing, open source art, and space colonisation." She edited the book WANTED: The search for the modernist murals of E. Mervyn Taylor, published in 2018.

Advocacy for the Creative Freedom Foundation
Holloway-Smith was involved in setting up the organisation Creative Freedom Foundation in 2008. The foundation seeks to "encourage and promote New Zealand artists' views on issues that have the potential to influence their collective creativity" such as copyright law. She was the director of the Creative Freedom Foundation until 2014.

In 2009, she presented a petition on behalf of 149 people requesting "that the House of Representatives immediately repeal section 92A of the Copyright Act 1994 (to be inserted by the Copyright (New Technologies) Amendment Act 2008), or delay its commencement." The petition was a culmination of the New Zealand Internet Blackout, and was presented to Parliament by Peter Dunne.

"Ghosts in the form of gifts"
In 2010, Holloway-Smith produced an exhibition called "Ghosts in the form of gifts", which was commissioned by Massey University in Wellington. The exhibition used 3D printers to recreate 10 objects which had been lost by the Museum of New Zealand. The objects she printed included "an adze, poi, a whale's tooth and a tapa beater among others. A Maori fishhook (Matau) sits next to the Utah teapot, a standard object used in graphic design, and a New Zealand giant snail shell." The files which she used to print the objects were released to the public under a Creative Commons licence. The project won the Open Art Award at the 2010 New Zealand Open Source Awards.

"Pioneer City"
In 2011, Holloway-Smith produced a series of works exploring the possibility of settling Mars. As part of this project, she won a competition to erect a billboard on Ghuznee Street, Wellington, advertising "Pioneer City" on Mars. The intention behind the work was to explore how the real estate industry has aimed its marketing at people's aspirations, and how residential developments are sometimes utopian:
"We have seen this with the boom in inner-city apartment living in the past decade. We saw it in the 19th century in the way the New Zealand Company sold a romanticised picture of New Zealand to prospective settlers before they’d visited the country. My project responds to this kind of marketing in the inner city and draws attention to its timelessness".
A website was also produced.

References

External links

Official website
City Gallery exhibition explores Kiwi identity and Bronwyn Holloway-Smith's inquiry into digital NZ, Stuff, 5 March 2018

Massey University alumni
Living people
Academic staff of the Massey University
People from Wellington City
New Zealand printmakers
Creative Commons-licensed authors
1982 births